Beauty in a Bottle is a 2014 Filipino satirical comedy drama film by Antoinette Jadaone. The film stars Angelica Panganiban, Angeline Quinto, and Assunta de Rossi and tells the story of three women and their struggles with their insecurities about how they look as they get caught up in the building craze for a new beauty product. It was produced by Quantum Films, Skylight Films and Star Cinema for its 20th Anniversary.

The film had its commercial release on October 29, 2014

Synopsis
Judith (Angeline Quinto), Vilma (Assunta De Rossi), and Estelle (Angelica Panganiban) are three women with different insecurities. Their lives intertwine when Vilma's advertising agency is looking for an endorser for a new beauty pill product called "Beauty in a Bottle." Little did they know, their lives will change when they finally accept what's inside the "Beauty in a Bottle."

Cast

Angelica Panganiban as Estelle Suarez
Angeline Quinto as Judith Madamba
Assunta de Rossi as Vilma Ledesma
Tom Rodriguez as Pocholo
Carmi Martin as Miss Santy
Cai Cortez as Wendy
Nanette Inventor as Donya Charito
Empress Schuck as herself
Ellen Adarna as Tanya Jacinto
Ana Roces as Joy Madamba
Dimples Romana as Anna
Ricci Chan as Brand Manager
Nico Antonio as Asst. Brand Manager
Boboy Garovillo as Doming
Bianca Manalo as Queenie
Anna Luna as Princess

Special participation
Vicki Belo as herself
Christalle Henares as herself
Marian Yance as Chesca
Maxine Medina as Atty. Peaches

Theme song
OH Boy Strong Sung by Toni Gonzaga from The Album Celestine.

References

External links
 

2014 films
2014 romantic comedy films
Philippine satirical films
Philippine romantic comedy films
Skylight Films films
Star Cinema films
Quantum Films films
Star Cinema satirical films
Star Cinema comedy films
Regal Entertainment films
Films directed by Antoinette Jadaone